KCEV may refer to:

 Mettel Field (ICAO code KCEV)
 KCEV-LP, a low-power radio station (106.1 FM) licensed to serve Marshall, Texas, United States